is the second mini album by Japanese rock band Rumania Montevideo. The mini album was released on March 29, 1999, by indie label Garage Indies Zapping Association. The album was rereleased on April 14, 1999.

Background
On the same day as the rerelease, the band released their debut single, Still For Your Love, under the major label Giza Studio, which was used as the ending theme for the anime television series, Detective Conan.

The album consists of a total of six tracks. All the songs are performed in English, and not in Japanese.

Shine Today was performed by composer Makoto Miyoshi, and not by original vocalist Mami.

Snap was later re-recorded as a completely new song with a new arrangement, lyrics, and composition. It was released as the single Digital Music Power on September. This was used as an ending theme for the anime television series Monster Rancher.

A Walk Shaded By Apple Trees was performed at the acoustic live performance UNDOWN vol.4. 

After the release of the album, the band left their indie label and joined the major label Giza Studio.

Track listing 
All tracks are composed by Makoto Miyoshi, written by Mami Miyoshi (except track #6, by Makoto Miyoshi) and arranged by Hirohito Furui.

Personnel

Mami Miyoshi – vocals, lyrics, drums
Makoto Miyoshi – vocals, lyrics, composing, guitar, arranging
Satomi Makoshi – bass
Akiko Matsuda – keyboard, saxophone
Kazunobu Mashima – guitar
Hirohito Furui – arranging (Garnet Crow)
Hitoshi Okamoto – guitar
Rockaku – executive producing
Red Way Studio – recording, mixing
Cule  – A&R

References 

1999 EPs
Japanese-language EPs
Being Inc. albums
Giza Studio albums
Rumania Montevideo albums
Albums produced by Daiko Nagato